Neoprososthenia is a genus of freshwater snails with gills and an operculum, aquatic gastropod mollusks in the family Pomatiopsidae.

Species 
The genus was established for extant species that were previously placed in the genus Paraprososthenia.

Species within the genus Neoprososthenia include:
 Neoprososthenia hanseni (Brandt, 1970)
 Neoprososthenia iijimai (Brandt, 1970)
 Neoprososthenia levayi (Bavay, 1895) - type species
 Neoprososthenia poirieri (Brandt, 1970)

References

Pomatiopsidae